The 25-45 Sharps (6.35×45mm) is a firearms cartridge designed by Michael H Blank, then CEO of the Sharps Rifle Company, LLC, as a general hunting cartridge for most North American game, in particular Deer, Antelope, Hogs, and Coyotes. Unlike 300 AAC Blackout which was targeted specifically at the suppressed rifle market, and adapted to hunting, the 25-45 Sharps was designed primarily as a hunting round.

That is not to say the round does not have tactical applications as its ballistics exceed that of the 5.56x45mm NATO cartridge. The cartridge name is derived from its caliber ( bullet) and case length of 45 millimeters (necked-up 5.56×45 mm), as opposed to older hyphenated cartridges that were named for caliber and powder charge. Factory ballistics with the  bullet equal those of the original .250-3000 Savage with the same bullet weight.

See also 
 6×45mm
 6.5×45 mm TCU
 6 mm calibre
 Table of handgun and rifle cartridges

References

External links
 Sharps Rifle Company

Pistol and rifle cartridges